William E. Merry (March 6, 1861 – February 4, 1941) was a member of the South Dakota House of Representatives.

Biography
Merry was born William Edgar Merry on March 6, 1861 in Royalton, Wisconsin. He moved to Dell Rapids, South Dakota in 1873.

On November 27, 1888, Merry married Reefa Hart. They would have four children before she died on January 27, 1924. He later married Lulu Blackman on June 2, 1926. Merry died on February 4, 1941. He was a Baptist.

His brother, George, was also a member of the South Dakota House of Representatives.

Career
Merry was a member of the House of Representatives from 1927 to 1928. He was a Republican.

References

People from Waupaca County, Wisconsin
People from Dell Rapids, South Dakota
Republican Party members of the South Dakota House of Representatives
1861 births
1941 deaths